The Wickham B is an American experimental twin engined, homebuilt aircraft.

Design and development
The twin engine aircraft was designed by Boeing engineer Jim Wickham in order to fly safely on one engine over the Seattle area.

The model B is a high-wing, fixed tricycle landing gear, twin engine aircraft. The aircraft uses all aluminum construction with fiberglass cowlings, nose cone and wheel pants. The wings are configured with Fowler flaps.  The wing has no dihedral.  The two  fuel tanks are located in the leading edges of the outboard panels just outboard of the engines. The fuel tanks are independent of each other with no cross feed capability or fuel lines in the cabin. The aircraft uses a throw-over yoke control, similar to a Beechcraft Bonanza. Design of the aircraft was started in December, 1957 and first flew in April, 1968.  Initially the engines were 125hp Lycoming O-290's but were subsequently changed to 150hp Lycoming O-320 engines.

Operational history
The Wickham B was donated to the Seattle Museum of Flight, then traded to the South Seattle Community College. In 2002, the aircraft was sold and restored to flying condition by Ross Mahon in Everett, Washington. In 2012 the plane was sold to Curtis Clark and it is based at Deer Valley Airport in Phoenix, Arizona.

Specifications (Model B)

See also

References

Homebuilt aircraft
High-wing aircraft
1960s United States sport aircraft
Twin piston-engined tractor aircraft